Five Points is an unincorporated community in Dubuque County, Iowa, United States.

History
Five Points' population was just 10 in 1925.

References

Unincorporated communities in Dubuque County, Iowa
Unincorporated communities in Iowa